Rockaway Townsquare is a two-level super regional shopping mall, located on Mount Hope Avenue in Rockaway Township, New Jersey. 
As of 2022, the mall currently features anchors Macy's, JCPenney, & Raymour & Flanigan, as well as Hollister Co., Guess, White House Black Market, J.Crew, and LUSH Cosmetics.

It is served by exit 35 of Interstate 80 and located directly south of that highway. Rockaway Townsquare is currently owned by the Simon Property Group. 

Rockaway Townsquare attracts customers from Morris, Sussex, and Warren counties and is under an hour away from New York City.

Mall history 
The mall first opened on Labor Day Weekend of 1977. It was built on top of a wetland, which was not protected in New Jersey until 1988 with the passage of the New Jersey Freshwater Wetlands Protection Act, and the former Dover town landfill. A time capsule was enclosed in the interior of the mall, marked with a plaque. The contents were unveiled on August 22, 2000.

Upon opening, the mall contained five large sculptures by Rita Blitt. Most were located on the first floor and reached up through openings to the second. A twenty-foot stainless steel and brass American flag hung from the ceiling. The silhouette of one of these sculptures, the yellow Stablitt 55, became the mall's original logo. Although the other sculptures have been removed, Stablitt 55 still stands outside the mall, on the corner near the three-store strip at the entrance off the main road.

Major stores that have since closed include: Bamberger's which was in the location currently occupied by Macy's (it was converted along with the other Bamberger's stores to the Macy's nameplate in 1986), Hahne's which was in the location most recently occupied by Lord & Taylor (converted to the L&T nameplate in 1988), Child World, which was occupied by Kids "R" Us after Child World went out of business in 1992, though was occupied by Office Depot after the majority of standalone KRU locations closed in 2003. (Office Depot has since closed as well; this space has since been converted to DSW, relocated from the existing Marketplace at Rockaway location; after Toys R Us closed in 2018, Toys R Us/Kids R Us is currently occupied by Party City), Acme, which is currently occupied by Nordstrom Rack, and Party Fair, which is currently occupied by Five Below, moving it from the shopping plaza where Target is. The old location is currently occupied by Orange Theory Fitness.

AMC Theatres had screens 1–6 in the location currently occupied by Forever 21 (previously FYE and Record Town) located inside the mall, as well as screens 7–12 in the location currently occupied by Best Buy in one of the strip malls located on the perimeter road. The 1–6 screens closed in 1998 and the 7–12 screens in 2002. When the theaters originally expanded from 6 screens to 12 in February 1981, it became the first 12-screen multiplex in America.

On August 25, 2009, a small plane crash-landed in the parking lot. The only injury was the pilot, who walked away and was treated.

In 2016, Sears subleased part of the store to Raymour & Flanigan. The Sears at the mall closed for good on September 13, 2020. 

On December 15, 2017, The Cheesecake Factory opened at Rockaway Townsquare. On February 23, 2022, P. F. Chang's opened at the mall.

Between January 2019 and Fall 2019, the food court was renovated.

The Lord & Taylor location at the mall was closed on December 29, 2020, leaving JCPenney and Macy's as the only traditional anchors left. The closing was part of the parent company's effort to close down all of the chain's stores nationwide.

Expansion
The mall has undergone several expansions since it opened. These include Rockaway Commoms, a strip mall in the southeast corner of the property and a Hilton Garden Inn. The Shops at Rockaway Mall, a strip mall, opened in the corner near Interstate 80. Rockaway Town Court is a strip mall at the East side of the mall.  Rockaway Town Plaza is a strip mall at the west side of the mall with a Target as an anchor. There is also a Health Pavilion for the Morristown Medical Center in the Complex.

In popular culture
A scene from the 1984 film Firstborn starring Sarah Jessica Parker features Parker's character Lisa shopping at Rockaway Townsquare.

In the 1980s, a local rock band by the name of Danger recorded a song about the mall. The song was accompanied by a video, which has since been uploaded to YouTube. Little other information is known about the band Danger.

References

Buildings and structures in Morris County, New Jersey
Rockaway Township, New Jersey
Shopping malls in New Jersey
Shopping malls established in 1977
Simon Property Group
Tourist attractions in Morris County, New Jersey
Shopping malls in the New York metropolitan area
Interstate 80
1977 establishments in New Jersey